John McCosker (October 10, 1910 – August 7, 1965) was an American rower. He competed in the men's coxless four event at the 1932 Summer Olympics.

References

External links
 

1910 births
1965 deaths
American male rowers
Olympic rowers of the United States
Rowers at the 1932 Summer Olympics
Rowers from Philadelphia